Children of God is the fifth studio album by American experimental rock band Swans. It was released on October 19, 1987, through record label Caroline.

Production 
The album was recorded over the course of six weeks in February–March 1987 at Sawmills Studios in Cornwall, England. It represented a dramatic, experimental change in sound from earlier Swans releases, moving away from the brutality of previous work to explore acoustic instruments and more conventional song structures.

Release history 
Children of God was reissued along with the World of Skin compilation (without the cover versions) as the 1997 Children of God/World of Skin CD. On the rerelease, the original album version of "Our Love Lies" was replaced with the version included on the Love Will Tear Us Apart EP. The re-release also added "Damn You to Hell" and "I'll Swallow You" (under one title as "I'll Swallow You") from the New Mind single. The tracks "Sex, God, Sex", "Beautiful Child" and "Children of God" were shortened by several seconds with earlier fadeouts, and "Trust Me" fades directly into the brief interlude at the end.

A remaster of the album, along with the live album Feel Good Now, was released on November 13, 2020.

Track listing 
Original release

Some pressings of the CD divide "Trust Me" into two tracks:  The actual song (4:28), and an unlisted/untitled interlude consisting of a field recording of a rowboat on the water, with birds in the background (0:57).
1997 re-release Children of God/World of Skin

Personnel 
 Michael Gira – vocals, keyboards, acoustic guitar, album cover concept and design, production
 Jarboe – vocals, backing vocals, piano, keyboards
 N. Westberg – electric guitar, acoustic guitar
 Algis Kizys – bass
 Theodore Parsons – drums, percussion
 Simon Fraser – flute on "In My Garden"
 Audrey Riley – cello on "Like a Drug (Sha La La La)"
 Lindsay Cooper – oboe on "Blackmail" and "Trust Me"
 Wilton Barnhardt – piano on "Blackmail"
 Rico Conning – production, engineering
 John Cornfield – engineering
 Laura Levine – sleeve photography
 Paul White/Me Company – sleeve artwork

Charts

References

External links 

 

Children of God
1987 albums
Caroline Records albums
Mute Records albums
Albums produced by Michael Gira